St Asaph railway station served the city of St Asaph in Denbighshire, Wales. It was opened by the Vale of Clwyd Railway (later absorbed into the London & North Western Railway) on 5 October 1858 and closed on 19 September 1955. The station building and northbound platform are now a private residence.

References

Further reading

Disused railway stations in Denbighshire
Former London and North Western Railway stations
Railway stations in Great Britain opened in 1858
Railway stations in Great Britain closed in 1955
St Asaph